David John Mantel (15 September 1981 – 1 December 2018) was a Dutch actor, film producer, and model.

Biography
Mantel appeared in the soap opera Les bons moments, les mauvais moments from 2013–14, playing the character Menno Kuiper. Additionally, he acted in the movies Les salutations de Mike and in the internationally recognized Regret!. He also played Frank Farmer in the musical The Bodyguard. In addition to acting, Mantel was also a photographer and filmmaker. He was an ambassador for the Free A Girl movement, starting in 2015. Mantel died of natural causes on 1 December 2018 in Amsterdam.

Filmography

Film

Television

References

External links 

 Dave Mantel on IMDb

1981 births
2018 deaths
Dutch male soap opera actors
Dutch male models